Bellon may refer to:

 Bellon (surname) 
 The Latin term "bellon" is a disused name for the condition now known as lead colic
Bellon, Charente, a commune in western France